Bonnie Soper (born 1984 in Invercargill, New Zealand) is a New Zealand film and television actress.

Early career
A graduate of the Unitec School of Performing and Screen Arts, her theatre credits include, Auckland Theatre Company's 2007 play The Pillowman which she co-starred in with former and current Shortland Street actors Oliver Driver and Craig Parker.

In 2006, Bonnie scored a lead role in the New Zealand feature film The Devil Dared Me To, released in cinemas on 11 October 2007. In Arkles Entertainment's feature film The Map Reader, scheduled to be released in 2008 she will play a young blind woman. Other credits include the short film We The Living, commercials and a music video for New Zealand band Dimmer.

In 2007, she featured in New Zealand band Deja Voodoo's music video Tracey, a song from the soundtrack of her film debut The Devil Dared Me To. Bonnie has appeared in the music video The Night, performed by New Zealand band Goodnight Nurse, the video was released in Australia and New Zealand on 4 February 2008.

Shortland Street
She is best known for her role of Morgan Braithwaite on New Zealand soap opera Shortland Street. Her first scenes were on the episode based on a day in the life of Joey Henderson the shortland street serial killer, which screened on 5 February 2008.

On 16 February 2008 Southland Times newspaper revealed that Bonnie's Shortland Street contract had been extended to three months after initially being contracted for three to six weeks. It was announced on 17 April 2008 that she will be returning to the show on 5 May. She appeared on the 2008 cast photo. Bonnie was then a full-time cast member and was featured in the opening credits.

On Friday 18 December 2009, Bonnie left the show as her character was accidentally killed by Kieran Mitchell, who is portrayed by Adam Rickitt.

Personal
She is a keen swimmer, taking part in the Mount Maunganui Sovereign Sand To Surf in March 2009 and in the North Shore King of the Bays swim in April 2009. After leaving Shortland Street at the end of 2009, Bonnie moved back to Invercargill.

Filmography

Theatre

References

External links
 Breakfast show interview
 Johnson Laird Talent Agency profile

1984 births
Living people
New Zealand stage actresses
New Zealand television actresses
People from Invercargill
21st-century New Zealand actresses
New Zealand soap opera actresses